Diary of an Afro Warrior is the second album by dubstep producer Benga. Released in 2008 it was met with favourable reviews and has been credited – along with fellow Tempa artist, Skream – with introducing the genre to a more mainstream audience.

Track listing

Expanded Edition

In popular culture
Some critics have noted the similarity between  the track 'Zero M2' and A Night in Tunisia by Dizzy Gillespie, as a likely tribute.

References

2008 albums
Benga (musician) albums